WIYN may refer to:

 WIYN Consortium
 WIYN Observatory, owned and operated by the WIYN Consortium
 WIYN (FM), a radio station (94.7 FM) licensed to Deposit, New York, United States